The Montreal Royals were a minor league professional baseball team in Montreal, Quebec, during 1897–1917 and 1928–1960. A member of the International League, the Royals were the top farm club (Class AAA) of the Brooklyn Dodgers from 1939; pioneering African-American player Jackie Robinson was a member for the 1946 season. The 1946 Royals were recognized as one of the 100 greatest minor league teams of all time.

History

In 1928, George Stallings, a former Major League Baseball executive and Southern United States planter, formed a partnership with Montreal lawyer and politician Athanase David and businessman Ernest Savard to resurrect the Montreal Royals. Among the team's other local affluent notables were close friends Lucien Beauregard, Romeo Gauvreau, Hector H. Racine, and Charles E. Trudeau. Trudeau, businessman and father of the future 15th Prime Minister of Canada, Pierre Trudeau (and grandfather to the 23rd Prime Minister, Justin Trudeau), would remain on the Montreal Baseball Club Inc. Board of Directors until his death in 1935. Together these men financed and built Delorimier Stadium (also known as Montreal Stadium, Hector Racine Stadium and Delorimier Downs) at Delorimier Avenue and Ontario Street in east-end Montreal to serve as the team's home field.

This version of the Montreal Royals enjoyed great success, particularly after it became the top farm team of the Dodgers in 1939. The Royals launched the baseball careers of Sparky Anderson, Gene Mauch, Roberto Clemente and the man who broke Major League Baseball's color barrier with Montreal in 1946, Jackie Robinson. Other Royals' players of note include Duke Snider, Don Drysdale, Chuck Connors, Walter Alston, Roy Campanella, Johnny Podres and the winningest pitcher in the history of the team, Tommy Lasorda.

The team holds a unique place in baseball history for being the first major-league affiliate to break the so-called "baseball color barrier". On October 23, 1945, two members of the Brooklyn National League Baseball Club Inc. Board of Directors, Montreal Royals owner and team president, Hector Racine, and Brooklyn Dodgers general manager, Branch Rickey, signed Jackie Robinson, an African-American. Robinson played with the Royals during the 1946 season. John Wright and Roy Partlow, black pitchers, also played with the Royals that year.

During that season, Robinson faced the race-related resistance from his manager (a Mississippian, Clay Hopper) and teammates but soon won them over with his masterful play (beginning with his spectacular debut in the opening game against the Jersey City Giants) and courage facing hostile crowds and opponents.  As for his home city, he was welcomed immediately by the public, who followed his performance that season with intense adoration. For the rest of his life, Robinson remained grateful to the people of Montreal for making the city a welcoming oasis for him and his wife during that difficult 1946 season. They lived in an apartment in a white neighborhood of Montreal that summer.

Robinson then left to play for the Dodgers the following year, but not before winning the Little World Series and being chased by exultant Montreal fans right to the train as he left. In Ken Burns' documentary film Baseball, the narrator quotes Sam Maltin, a sports journalist with the Montreal Herald: "It was probably the only day in history that a black man ran from a white mob with love instead of lynching on its mind."

The Royals continued through the 1960 season, two years after the Dodgers moved to Los Angeles. On September 13, 1960, Dodgers President Walter O'Malley announced that due to weak attendance, the Dodgers were ending their 21-year affiliation with the team. While a new affiliation with the Minnesota Twins was arranged, efforts to keep the team in Montreal failed, and the franchise was relocated to Syracuse, New York for 1961, and became the Syracuse Chiefs. Montreal would gain an MLB team, the Expos, in 1969; "Royals" was suggested as a nickname for that team but was taken instead by the new American League club in Kansas City.

Titles

The Royals won the Governors' Cup, the championship of the IL, 7 times, and played in the championship series 11 times.

1935 – Lost to Syracuse
1941 – Defeated Newark
1945 – Lost to Newark
1946 – Defeated Syracuse
1948 – Defeated Syracuse
1949 – Defeated Buffalo
1951 – Defeated Syracuse
1952 – Lost to Rochester
1953 – Defeated Rochester
1954 – Lost to Syracuse
1958 – Defeated Toronto

Montreal Royals records

Junior World Series Appearances

Montreal Royals managers

Notable former players

 Sparky Anderson – Major League Hall of Famer
 Joe Altobelli – World Series-winning manager
 Roy Campanella – Major League Baseball Hall of Famer
 Al Campanis – Major League scout and general manager
 Roberto Clemente – Major League Hall of Famer
 Chuck Connors – Major League first baseman and pinch-hitter
 Tommy Davis – Major League outfielder and corner infielder
 Don Drysdale – Major League Hall of Famer
 Carl Erskine – Major League pitcher
 George Gibson – Major League catcher and manager
 Jim Gilliam – Major League infielder
 Al Gionfriddo – Major League outfielder
 Carl Furillo – Major League outfielder
 Waite Hoyt – Major League Hall of Famer
 Sam Jethroe – Negro league and Major League center fielder
 Tommy Lasorda – Major League Hall of Famer
 Van Lingle Mungo – Major League pitcher
 Sam Nahem – Major League pitcher
 Don Newcombe – Major League pitcher
 Johnny Podres – Major League pitcher
 Pete Reiser – Major League outfielder
 John Roseboro – Major League catcher
 Goody Rosen – Major League All Star outfielder
 Jackie Robinson – Major League Hall of Famer
 Schoolboy Rowe – Major League All Star pitcher
 Duke Snider – Major League Hall of Famer
 George Shuba - Major League outfielder
 Bucky Walters – Major League pitcher
 Dick Williams – Major League outfielder-third baseman and World-Series-winning manager

Montreal Royals in the Major League Baseball Hall of Fame

International League awards

Most Valuable Pitcher
First Awarded in 1953

Most Valuable Player

Rookie of the Year
First Awarded in 1950.

Triple Crown Winner
Given to the player who leads the league in Home Runs, Runs Batted In, and Batting Average

Notable media personnel
 Charles Mayer – French language radio broadcaster

Bibliography
 William Brown (foreword by Ken Singleton): Baseball's Fabulous Montreal Royals (1996) Robert Davies Publishing, 1996 –

References

 
Baseball teams established in 1897
Sports clubs disestablished in 1960
Defunct International League teams
Brooklyn Dodgers minor league affiliates
Los Angeles Dodgers minor league affiliates
Philadelphia Athletics minor league affiliates
Pittsburgh Pirates minor league affiliates
Defunct baseball teams in Canada
Roy
Syracuse Mets
1897 establishments in Quebec
1917 disestablishments in Quebec
1928 establishments in Quebec
1960 disestablishments in Quebec
Baseball teams disestablished in 1960
Ontario–Quebec–Vermont League teams